Byron Hyland (born 14 January 1930) is an Australian former cricketer. He played thirteen first-class matches for Tasmania between 1953 and 1964.

See also
 List of Tasmanian representative cricketers

References

External links
 

1930 births
Living people
Australian cricketers
Tasmania cricketers
Cricketers from Tasmania